AFL Townsville is an amateur competition formed as the Townsville Australian Football League in 1955, the first contemporary AFL competition to be formed outside of the South East Queensland. It is based in the city of Townsville. For a short period in the 1980s, the competition was played during the summer months. The representative team is known as the Eagles and they wear similar guernseys to the Zillmere Eagles' old white and blue guernseys.

History
A Townsville representative team travelled to Cairns in 1884 to play one of the earliest recorded matches in Far North Queensland. It is not known how long the Townsville team began playing prior to this.

Australian Football is recorded to have been played regularly in Townsville in 1886.

The game was short-lived in Far North Queensland as shortly following the folding of the governing body, the Queensland Football Association Rugby Union grew rapidly in popularity across the north of the state with new clubs being formed in areas where the QFA clubs has been and players switching codes.

The current league was launched with three teams, RAAF, Hermit Park and South Townsville in 1954, after a series of exhibition matches were played at RAAF Oval and Gill Park and an exhibition game at the Townsville Showgrounds. All clubs were founded with juniors.

The Garbutt club was formed in 1956. In 1961, Currajong replaced the RAAF who withdrew due to a struggle for numbers.
Australia's involvement in the Vietnam War led to the Army entering the scene in 1968 when 6 RAR and a revived RAAF side expanded the league to 6 teams.
 
The Wulguru club was established in 1968, entered senior sides and this made the league up to 7 sides. As Australia's involvement in Vietnam wound down the Army withdrew. The competition was to remain with 6 sides from 1976 – 1982 until in 1983 a side from Burdekin increased the numbers once again to 7. Burdekin was made up from converted Rugby players and the team had almost no support apart from the management of the Delta Hotel. The demise of Wulguru followed in early 1984 when the league made a decision which would have significant consequences. Four seasons of summer football followed and while the “Darwin” seasons attracted some top players junior development was stifled.

Currajong in 1990 swallowed up a penniless Townsville Swans, who had switched from South Townsville in June 1982 to become the Curra Swans. The nomination of the Hawks club in 1989 caused a stir due to the number of current players recruited from Hermit Park, Currajong and South Townsville using suspect overtures , although be that as it may the club were premiers by a point in their first season.

The league lost three teams in 1989 and the following year only Hermit Park, West Townsville, Curra Swans, and the University Hawks remained.
 
In 1999, the Northern Beaches Lions entered the TAFL in an attempt to expand the shattered league. Unfortunately, they endured season after season of enormous defeats. In one match that year, Steve Mazey of West Townsville kicked 27 goals against them.  The Northern Beaches Lions were renamed to the Twin City Lions in 2002 and continued to struggle until the end of 2008 when they went into recess with only one win to their credit in August 2004 over Curra Swans. The Lions regrouped and returned with much more solid foundations in 2012 under the banner of "Townsville City Lions". Despite losing every match that year, often at record margins, the determined Lions upgraded their Garbutt facility and won their second Senior match in June 2013 by a goal against University.

Despite the lack of growth in the Seniors, AFL Townsville enjoyed a massive surge in the Junior ranks in more recent years, numbers had increased, and now hundreds of children and teenagers turn out to give their all for their respective clubs.

In 2010, the Thuringowa Bulldogs (former West Townsville) won their first Senior premiership since 2001 in their 40th year and went on to go back to back in 2011.

Premiers

 1955 Hermit Park
 1956 RAAF
 1957 South Townsville
 1958 Garbutt
 1959 South Townsville
 1960 South Townsville
 1961 Garbutt
 1962 Garbutt
 1963 South Townsville
 1964 Garbutt
 1965 Garbutt
 1966 Garbutt
 1967 Hermit Park
 1968 South Townsville
 1969 2RAR
 1970 Hermit Park
 1971 West Townsville
 1972 Lavarack
 1973 Currajong
 1974 South Townsville
 1975 Currajong
 1976 Currajong

 1977 Currajong
 1978 Currajong
 1979 Currajong
 1980 West Townsville
 1981 Wulguru
 1982 Garbutt
 1983 Currajong
 1984 Currajong
 1984/85 Hermit Park
 1985/86 Currajong
 1986/87 Hermit Park
 1987/88 West Townsville
 1988 Townsville
 1989 University Hawks
 1990 West Townsville
 1991 West Townsville
 1992 West Townsville
 1993 University Hawks
 1994 University Hawks
 1995 University Hawks
 1996 Curra Swans
 1997 Curra Swans

 1998 Curra Swans
 1999 West Townsville
 2000 West Townsville
 2001 West Townsville
 2002 Hermit Park
 2003 University Hawks
 2004 University Hawks
 2005 University Hawks
 2006 Hermit Park
 2007 University Hawks
 2008 Hermit Park
 2009 University Hawks
 2010 Thuringowa
 2011 Thuringowa
 2012 Hermit Park
 2013 Thuringowa
 2014 Thuringowa
 2015 Hermit Park
 2016 Thuringowa
 2017 Hermit Park
 2018 Hermit Park
 2019 Hermit Park
 2020 Curra Swans 
 2021 Hermit Park 
 2022 Thuringowa

Clubs

Current

W.J.Williams Medal (League Best & Fairest)

 
1955 W.Bene-Best - RAAF
1956 Lionel Hall - Garbutt
1957 J. Kennedy, R.Dillon - South Townsville, Garbutt
1958 Max Craig - South Townsville
1959 Steve Lampton - Garbutt
1960 James MacDonald - Garbutt
1961 Ricco Butler - Garbutt
1962 Eric Johns - Hermit Park
1963 Claude Morris - Currajong
1964 Ricco Butler - Garbutt
1965 Terry Gouki - South Townsville 
1966 Chris Reynolds - Hermit Park
1967 Ricco Butler - Garbutt
1968 Jack Van Damme - Currajong
1969 Dave Christie - 2RAR
1970 Peter Cox - Currajong
1971 Bob Anderson - Hermit Park
1972 Ray McGrath - South Townsville
1973 Florio Da're - West Townsville
1974 Florio Da're - West Townsville
1975 John Bangle - West Townsville
1976 Keith Sedgman - West Townsville
1977 Graham Wilson - West Townsville
1978 Dave Nogar - Garbutt
1979 Paul Smith - Wulguru Saints
1980 Mark Fedley - South Townsville
1981 Paul Smith - Wulguru Saints
1982 Steve Lovell - Hermit Park
1983 Brett Franklin - Hermit Park
1984 Ken Johnson - Currajong
1984/5 Brian Hope - Townsville Swans
1985/6 Larry Howson - West Townsville
1986/7 Robert Scott - Townsville Swans
1987/8 Larry Howson - West Townsville

1988 Alan Chirgwin - Townsville Swans
1989 Hugh Bresser - James Cook University
1990 Garry Cook - West Townsville
1991 Andrew Cadzow - Heatley Hawks
1992 Brett Howson - West Townsville
1993 Steve Talbot - Hermit Park
1994 Peter Appleford - West Townsville
1995 Peter Pyle - Curra Swans
1996 Peter Appleford - West Townsville
1997 M. Jolly - Hermit Park
1998 Nigel Aikin - Hermit Park
1999 Peter Appleford - West Townsville
2000 Peter Appleford - West Townsville
2001 Corey Hewitt - Curra Swans
2002 Corey Hewitt - Curra Swans
2003 Stephen Montano - University Hawks
2004 Glenn Robertson - Thuringowa
2005 Steve Montano, Ben Broadbent - University Hawks
2006 Andrew Grubba - Hermit Park
2007 Steve Montano - University Hawks
2008 Michael Krake - Hermit Park
2009 Brent Doyle - Curra Swans
2010 Cameron Leman - Thuringowa
2011 Adam McDonald - Curra Swans
2012 Clint Austerberry - Thuringowa
2013 Cody Richardson - Thuringowa
2014 Jason Di Betta - Hermit Park 
2015 Nathan Peters - Hermit Park
2016 Daine MacDonald- Thuringowa
2017 Daine MacDonald - Thuringowa 
2018 Troy Sherratt/Daniel Broderick - University Hawks
2019 Shane Lindgren - Curra Swans
2020 Tyson Williams - Thuringowa
2021 Callaway Parker - Hermit Park 
2022 Joel Newman - Thuringowa

2009 Ladder

2010 Ladder

2011 Ladder

2012 Ladder

2013 Ladder

2014 Ladder

2015 Ladder

2016 Ladder

2017 Ladder

2018 Ladder

2019 Ladder

2020 Ladder

See also

Australian Rules football in Queensland

References

External links
AFL Townsville official website

Australian rules football competitions in Queensland
Sport in Townsville
1955 establishments in Australia